The 1998 Minnesota Attorney General election was held on Tuesday, November 3, 1998 to elect the Minnesota Attorney General for a four-year term. Incumbent DFL Attorney General Skip Humphrey ran for governor, and DFLer Mike Hatch won the election to replace him. The election marked the eighth attorney general race in a row won by the DFL since 1970.

Democratic–Farmer–Labor primary 
The primary was held on September 15. Lawyer Mike Hatch won the DFL nomination. Hatch faced off against State Senator Ember Reichgott Junge and former United States Attorney David Lillehaug.

Candidates

Nominated in primary 

 Mike Hatch, lawyer, former Minnesota Commissioner of Commerce, former DFL Party chairman

Elimated in primary 

 Ember Reichgott Junge, state senator
 David Lillehaug, former United States attorney

Results

Independent-Republican primary 
The primary was held on September 15. State Representative Charlie Weaver Jr. won the Republican nomination over perennial candidate Sharon Anderson.

Candidates

Nominated in primary 

 Charlie Weaver Jr., state representative, lawyer

Elimated in primary 

 Sharon Anderson, activist, perennial candidate

Results

Other candidates

Reform Party

Nominee 

 Jim Mangan

Results

Libertarian Party

Nominee 

 Ruth A. Mason

General election

Results

References 

Attorney General
Minnesota Attorney General elections
Minnesota